Union of Informal Workers Associations (UNIWA) is Ghana's first national trade union for workers in the informal economy. It was established in 2013 under the name CIWA (Council of Informal Workers Associations) which was later changed to UNIWA in recognition of its status as a trade union. It is affiliated with the Trade Union Congress of Ghana.
The informal sector is a large part of the Ghanaian economy. It contributes around 40.6% to the GDP of Ghana and around 90% of the workforce is employed in the informal sector. The nature of the informal economy entails that workers in the sector are often vulnerable to exploitation. UNIWA was therefore set up as a way of organizing informal workers to protect their rights.

Aims

The aim of UNIWA is to organise informal workers into trade unions in order to promote their common interest and strengthen their bargaining power vis-à-vis the government and employers. 
More specifically, the aims of UNIWA include:

 To organize workers in the informal economy into association with the purpose of protecting, sustaining and promoting their common interest
 To organize seminars, workshops and other programs for the education of members of member association
 To assist member associations in negotiating appropriate remuneration, hours of work and other terms of employment of its members
 To assist the Trade Union Congress of Ghana (TUC) and other national Unions to achieve their aims and objectives of protecting workers rights
 To provide legal assistance to members as and when necessary

Members

The organisation consists of a number of affiliated organisations which are as follows:

Founding members:

Musicians Union of Ghana (MUSIGA)
Ghana Actors Guild (GAG)
Ghana Union of physically disabled workers (GUPDW)
New Makola Market Traders Union
Greater Accra Tomato Traders Association (GATTA)
Agbobloshie Chop Bar Keepers Association
Wacam
Ghana Youth Porters Association
Ga East Traders Association

New Associations yet to be admitted into UNIWA:

Indigenous Caterers Association
Informal Hawkers and Venders Association, Ghana (IHVAG)  Streetnet
Novotel Market N0.2 Odorna
Tema Station Market Association
Greater Accra Market Association

References

2013 establishments in Ghana
Precarious workers' trade unions
Trade unions established in 2013
Trade unions in Ghana